Christopher David Mole (born 16 March 1958) is a British Labour Party politician, who was the Member of Parliament for Ipswich from a by-election in 2001, after the death of Jamie Cann, and was re-elected in 2005. He was Parliamentary Under Secretary of State at the Department for Transport, until his defeat in the 2010 general election by Ben Gummer of the Conservative Party.

Early life
Mole attended Dulwich College. He gained a degree in Electronics from the University of Kent and moved to Ipswich in 1981 to work at the BT Laboratories at Martlesham Heath. During that time he served as Branch Secretary of the Research Branch of the white collar BT-only union then called the STE. It is now a cross industry union called Connect.

He was first elected to Suffolk County Council in 1985 and represented a central Ipswich division for 18 years. He was Deputy Chair of EEDA, the regional development agency for the East of England, from 1998 and was Leader of Suffolk County Council from 1993, named Council of the Year 2001, until his election as Member of Parliament. He was a governor of Handford Hall Primary School, Ipswich.

Parliamentary career
In the 2001 parliament, Mole served as a member of the Select Committee that scrutinised the work of the Office of the Deputy Prime Minister, the Deregulation and Regulatory Affairs Select Committee and the Joint Committee on Statutory Instruments. He steered his Private Member's Bill onto the Statute Book where it became the Legal Deposit Libraries Act 2003, extending the concept of legal deposit to electronic records; the Bill was strongly promoted by the British Library

Mole was appointed in June 2005 to the position of Parliamentary Private Secretary PPS to the Local Government Minister Phil Woolas. He resigned from this position on 6 September 2006 after signing a letter calling on Prime Minister Tony Blair to step down. When Gordon Brown became Prime Minister, Mole was recalled to a PPS position, taking the post of PPS to John Healey, the Minister of State for the Department for Communities and Local Government on 28 June 2007. From 16 January 2007 until 20 August 2008, Mole was a member of the Science and Technology Committee.

In October 2008 he was made an Assistant Whip in the Labour government and acted as Assistant Regional Minister with Barbara Follett, the Regional Minister for the East of England. He became a minister for the first time in the June 2009 reshuffle when he was appointed to the Department for Transport as a Parliamentary Under Secretary of State.

Personal life
He lives in East Ipswich with his wife Shona (née Gibb), a systems analyst for BT in Ipswich, and their two sons Edward (born 1991) and Thomas (born 1994).

Since leaving the House of Commons in 2010, Chris has volunteered at the Ipswich and Suffolk Credit Union, becoming their general manager in June 2011.

References

External links
 Ipswich Labour Party site
 Guardian Unlimited Politics – Ask Aristotle: Chris Mole MP
 TheyWorkForYou.com – Chris Mole MP
 BBC Politics 
 By-election

1958 births
Alumni of the University of Kent
British Telecom people
Leaders of local authorities of England
Members of Suffolk County Council
Labour Party (UK) MPs for English constituencies
Living people
Members of the Parliament of the United Kingdom for Ipswich
People educated at Dulwich College
UK MPs 2001–2005
UK MPs 2005–2010